Something Borrowed, Something Blue is an album by pianist Tommy Flanagan recorded in 1978 for the Galaxy label.

Reception

AllMusic awarded the album 3½ stars, stating: "This is a typically flawless trio set from the tasteful and swinging bop-based pianist Tommy Flanagan. ...If Flanagan had not recorded so many equally rewarding sets during the past 20 years, this fine CD would have received a higher rating; virtually every one of his recordings is well worth picking up".

Track listing
 "Bird Song" (Thad Jones) - 4:47
 "Good Bait" (Tadd Dameron, Count Basie)  - 4:06
 "Peace" (Horace Silver) - 6:13
 "Friday the 13th" (Thelonious Monk) - 3:51
 "Something Borrowed, Something Blue" (Tommy Flanagan) - 6:36
 "West Coast Blues" (Wes Montgomery) - 6:43
 "Groovin' High" (Dizzy Gillespie) - 6:16

Personnel 
Tommy Flanagan - piano, electric piano
Keter Betts - bass
Jimmie Smith - drums

References 

1978 albums
Tommy Flanagan albums
Galaxy Records albums